Robert Lindstedt and Horia Tecău were the defending champions, but Lindstedt decided to participate in Barcelona instead.
Tecău successfully defended the title alongside Max Mirnyi, defeating Lukáš Dlouhý and Oliver Marach in the final, 4–6, 6–4, [10–6].

Seeds

Draw

Draw

References
 Main Draw

BRD Nastase Tiriac Trophyandnbsp;- Doubles
2013 Doubles